Haddon Bay is a bay lying immediately east of Mount Alexander along the south coast of Joinville Island, Antarctica. It was discovered in January 1893 by Thomas Robertson, master of the ship Active, one of the Dundee whalers. The bay was surveyed by the Falkland Islands Dependencies Survey in 1953 and named by the UK Antarctic Place-Names Committee in 1956 for Professor Alfred C. Haddon, who helped Dr. W.S. Bruce with his preparations for scientific work with the Dundee whaling expedition.

References

Bays of Graham Land
Landforms of the Joinville Island group